Tiger is an unincorporated community in Pend Oreille County, Washington, United States.

Tiger had its start in 1899 when George Tiger established a river landing there.

Geography
Tiger is located on the west bank of the Pend Oreille River as it flows north towards British Columbia, Canada. The nearest settlement is Ione.

References

Unincorporated communities in Pend Oreille County, Washington
Unincorporated communities in Washington (state)